Hussniyya is a Bedouin village in northern Israel. Located in the Galilee near Karmiel, it falls under the jurisdiction of Misgav Regional Council.

History
The village was recognized by the state in 1996. Its inhabitants belong to the Swaid tribe. The women of Hussniya offer guided tours of the area focusing on picking and cooking wild plants. Zahiya Swaid heads a group of women who attended a business development course and now earn a living from the age-old Bedouin tradition of foraging wild plants for food and medicinal purposes.

See also
Arab localities in Israel
Bedouin in Israel

References

External links

Arab villages in Israel
Bedouin localities in Israel
Populated places in Northern District (Israel)